Archibald Jerard Weaver (April 15, 1843 – April 18, 1887) was an American Republican Party politician, best known for being the father of Governor of Nebraska Arthur J. Weaver and grandfather of Nebraska politicians Arthur J. Weaver Jr. and Phillip Hart Weaver.

He was born in Dundaff, Pennsylvania, on April 15, 1843, and graduated from Wyoming Seminary, Kingston, Pennsylvania. He became a faculty member of the school from 1864 to 1867. In 1869, he graduated from Harvard Law School and was admitted to the bar in Boston, Massachusetts. He moved to Falls City, Nebraska, in 1869 to practice law.

He attended the State constitutional conventions in 1871 and 1875 and became the district attorney for the first district of Nebraska in 1872. In 1875 and 1879 he was elected judge of the first judicial district of Nebraska. He resigned in 1883 having been elected as a Republican to the Forty-eighth United States Congress. He was then reelected to the Forty-ninth United States Congress, but did not run for reelection in 1886. He ran unsuccessfully in 1887 for the United States Senate, lost and resumed his practice of law. He died in Falls City on April 18, 1887, and is buried in Steele Cemetery in Falls City.

References
 
 
 
 

1843 births
1887 deaths
Harvard Law School alumni
Nebraska state court judges
People from Falls City, Nebraska
Republican Party members of the United States House of Representatives from Nebraska
19th-century American politicians
19th-century American judges